The Hadhrami (singular) or Hadharem (plural) are an Arab ethnic group indigenous to the Hadhramaut region in South Arabia in the Eastern part of  Yemen. They speak Hadhrami Arabic, an Arabic dialect with heavy influence from the extinct South Semitic Hadramautic language.

Among the two million inhabitants of Hadhramaut, there are about 1,300 distinct tribes.

History and diaspora
The Hadharem have a long seafaring and trading tradition that predates Semitic cultures, the Semitic Hadramites diaspora was historically the Mofarite & Gurage mercantile Semitic pioneers in East Africa, Hadramite influence was later over shadowed by the rise of the temple of the Moon governing Sabaean Semites that saw the concentration of power switch to a governing ruling class.  With Governing pressure in the South Semitic regions Hadhrami seamen navigated in large numbers all around the Indian Ocean basin, from the some part around the Horn of Africa, to the Swahili Coast to the Malabar Coast and Hyderabad in South India, Sri Lanka to Maritime Southeast Asia. They were involved in many places as organizers of the Haj.

There are Hadharem communities in western Yemen and in the trading ports of the Arab States of the Persian Gulf and the Red Sea. The money changers in Jeddah, Saudi Arabia have usually been of Hadhrami origin.

Hadhrami East Africans

The Hadhrami have long had a notable presence in the African Horn region (Djibouti, Ethiopia and Somalia). Descendants of Hadhramis make up a notable part of the Harari population. Hadhrami settlers were instrumental in helping to consolidate the Muslim community in the coastal Benadir province of Somalia, in particular. During the colonial period, disgruntled Hadhrami from the tribal wars additionally settled in various Somali towns. They were also frequently recruited into the armies of the Somali Sultanates.

Some Hadhrami communities also reportedly exist in Mozambique, Comoros, and Madagascar.

Hadhrami Jews
The vast majority of the Hadhrami Jews now live in Israel.

Language
The Hadhrami speak Hadhrami Arabic, a variety of Arabic, while the diaspora populations that have acculturated mainly speak the local language of the region they live in.

Diaspora communities

 Sri Lankan Moors
 Arab Indonesian
 Arab Malaysian
 Arab Singaporean
 Chaush, India
 Sodagar (Gujarati Shaikh)
 Konkani Muslims of the Konkani division of Maharashtra (partially)
 Nawayath, of Maharashtra, Goa and Karnataka, India; Barkas, Hyderabad, India
 Mappila of Kerala, India
 Hadhrami Jews in Israel and abroad
 The Surti Sunni Vohra Community in Gujarat that are partially of Hadhrami descent
 Lemba people who claim Jewish ancestry via Hadramaut's historic Jewish population

Hadhrami people

Swahili Coast
 Awadh Saleh Sherman, Kenya, businessman
 Najib Balala, Kenya, Minister of Tourism
 Ahmed Abdallah Mohamed Sambi,  President of Comoros
 Habib Salih, Lamu, Kenya, religious scholar
 Khadija Abdalla Bajaber, Mombasa, Kenya, poet and novelist
 Mohamed Saleh Bawazir, businessman and philanthropist
 Taiba Ali Bajaber, former Mayor Mombasa

North Africa
 Artega tribe, Babkeer, Sudan

Horn of Africa
 Mohammed Al Amoudi, Ethiopia, businessman

Indonesia
 Abdurrahman Baswedan, Journalist
 Abdurrahman Shihab, Academican and Politician
 Najwa Shihab, Journalist and tv presenter
 Abu Bakar Bashir, founder of Jamaah Islamiyah
 Ali Alatas, former Foreign Minister
 Alwi Shihab, former Foreign Minister, special envoy to Middle East and OIC
 Anies Baswedan, scholar, former Education Minister, Governor of Jakarta (2017-)
 Nadiem Anwar Makarim, Minister of Education and Culture
 Fadel Muhammad al-Haddar, former Minister of Maritime Affairs and Fisheries
 Fuad Hassan, Minister of Education and Culture
 Hamid Algadri, a figure in Indonesian National Revolution and member of parliament
 Sultan Hamid II, Pontianak Sultanate
 Habib Abdoe'r Rahman Alzahier, religious leader
 Habib Ali al-Habshi of Kwitang, religious leader
 Habib Munzir Al-Musawa, Islamic cleric
 Habib Rizieq Shihab, founder of FPI
 Habib Usman bin Yahya, Mufti of Batavia
 Jafar Umar Thalib, founder of Laskar Jihad
 Sultan Badaruddin II, Sultan of Palembang
 Munir Said Thalib Al-Kathiri, human rights activist
 Nuruddin ar-Raniri, Islamic scholar
 Quraish Shihab, Islamic scholar
 Raden Saleh, Artist/painter
 Said Naum, a philanthropist
 Sayyid Abdullah Al-Aidarus, religious leader
 Andi Soraya, Actress
 Ahmad Albar, Musician

East Timor
 Mari Alkatiri, former Prime Minister

Malaysia
 Habib Alwi bin Thahir al-Haddad, Mufti of Johor Bahru
 Scha Alyahya
 Syed Muhammad Naquib al-Attas, philosopher
 Syed Hussein Alatas, politician and sociologist
 Abdullah bin Abdul Kadir, writer
 Syed Hamid Albar, politician
 Syed Jaafar Albar, politician
 Syed Sheh Hassan Barakbah, judge
 Syarif Masahor, warrior
 Syed Mokhtar Al-Bukhary businessman
 Syed Nasir Ismail, politician
 Tun Habib Abdul Majid, Grand Vizier
 Zeti Akhtar Aziz, Governor of Central Bank
 House of Jamalullail (Perak)
 House of Jamalullail (Perlis)

Singapore
 Alsagoff family
 Syed Abdul Rahman Alsagoff, merchant
 Syed Mohamed Alsagoff, military leader
 Syed Sharif Omar bin Ali Al Junied, merchant and namesake of Aljunied Road

South Asia
 General El Edroos
 Shaik Salman Bin Abdul Jabbar Bawazeer, A.C Guards, Hyderabad, India
 Sulaiman Areeb, Hyderabad, India, poet
 Awaz Sayeed, Hyderabad, India, Urdu writer and poet
 Ahmed Abdullah Masdoosi, Pakistan
 Nuruddin ar-Raniri, Islamic scholar
 Shah Jalal, Bangladesh, Sufi saint
 Shah Paran, Bangladesh, Sufi saint
 Subhani ba Yunus, Pakistan, actor
Bin Gursain Family hyderabad,India.
 Abdul rahman Ballesharam alsharam al nomani hyderabad india.
  Abubaker bin salam bahardan hyderabad india.
  Bin Shahbal hyderabad india.

Qatar
 Bawazir family
 Bayazid family
 Bin Hilabi family
 Bahantoush Al-Kindi family
 Belgaith family
 Bakhamees family
 Al Attas family
 Al Kathiri family
 Al Baharoon family
 Bin Shahbal family

Saudi Arabia
 bin Laden family
 Mohammed Al Amoudi, businessman
Bin Gursain family
Khalid bin Mahfouz

Yemen
 Mohammed A. Al-Hadhrami, the Foreign Minister of the Republic of Yemen and other people from North Yemen are not Hadhrami. On the other hand Al-Hadhrami tribe in South Yemen are descendants of the Yafai Hadhrami tribes that were part of the Quaiti Kingdom
 Waleed salam Bills wad Bin Hilabi
 Abd Al-Rahman Ali Al-Jifri, politician
 Abdulaziz Al-Saqqaf, human-rights activist
 Faisal Bin Shamlan, politician
 Habib Ali al-Jifri, Islamic scholar
 Habib Umar bin Hafiz, Islamic scholar
 Habib Abdullah bin Alwi al-Haddad, Sufi saint
 Imam Muhammad al-Faqih Muqaddam, founder of Ba'alawi Sufi order
 Sayyid Abu Bakr Al-Aidarus (saint)
 Syed Alwi Jamalullail, wali

See also
 Arab Indonesians
 Hadrami sheikhdom
 History of the Jews in Hadramaut
 Ibn Khaldun al-Hadrami
 Lemba people
 Yemenite Jews

References

Further reading

 AHMED BIN SALAM BAHIYAL who came from hadramaut to MAHABUBNAGAR (HYDERABAD) INDIA, 1821

 
Arab groups
Arab diaspora
Yemeni diaspora
Ethnic groups in the Middle East